Mikita Brottman, née Mikita Hoy, (born 1966) is a British American non-fiction author, scholar, and psychologist known for her interest in true crime. Her writing blends a number of genres, often incorporating elements of autobiography, psychoanalysis, forensic psychology, and literary history.

Life and career 
Brottman was born in Sheffield, England, and educated at St. Hilda's College and St. Hugh's College, University of Oxford, from which she received a D.Phil in English Language and Literature (1994). She was Visiting Professor of Comparative literature at Indiana University and was Chair of the Program in Humanities with an emphasis in Depth Psychology at the Pacifica Graduate Institute from 2008 to 2010. She is a certified psychoanalyst and a full faculty Professor in the Department of Humanistic Studies at the Maryland Institute College of Art, in Baltimore. Brottman also works in the Maryland prison system and in forensic psychiatric facilities.

Themes 
Brottman's work has included writing on horror films, critical theory, reading, psychoanalysis, animals, and the work of the American folklorist, Gershon Legman. Her articles and case studies have appeared in The American Journal of Psychoanalysis, New Literary History, American Imago, and other journals. Her essays have also appeared in a number of books and anthologies. Her book The Solitary Vice: Against Reading (2009) was selected as one of the Best Books of 2009 by Publishers Weekly, who said: "Sharp, whimsical and impassioned, Brottman's look at the pleasures and perils of compulsive reading is itself compulsively readable and will connect with any book lover." In 2018, a Spanish edition was published by Blackie Books, under the title Contra La Lectura.

The most consistent focus of Brottman's work, however, is her reconsideration and transformation of the true crime genre. Thirteen Girls (Nine-Banded Books, 2012) is a story cycle of fictionalized narratives, each based on a real victim of a serial killer, each told from a different perspective. According to a review of the book in Rain Taxi, "Brottman’s grimly pragmatic literary stance recalls such earlier artists of the quotidian macabre as Shirley Jackson and Flannery O’Connor: Thirteen Girls is an impressive successor to their stories of American dread." The Maximum Security Book Club: Reading Literature in a Men's Prison (2016) describes Brottman's relationship with nine inmates in a reading group she started at Jessup Correctional Institution, a men's maximum security prison, and their reactions to the works of classic literature they read together.

Her most recent book, An Unexplained Death - The True Story of a Body at the Belvedere (2018), is a discursive and philosophical meditation on suicide, voyeurism, missing people, deaths in hotels, and the author's obsessive investigation into the mysterious death of Rey Rivera in Baltimore's Belvedere Hotel in 2006. Described by James Ellroy as "a learned, lucid, and finally heartbreaking account of urban obsession," the book has been short-listed for the 2019 Gold Dagger for nonfiction by the Crime Writers' Association of the United Kingdom.

Brottman's true crime podcast, Forensic Transmissions, is a curated archive of unedited public domain audio files.

Personal life 
Brottman is the partner of the American film critic David Sterritt. She is the daughter of Linda Hoy.

Books
Meat Is Murder, Creation Books, 1998
Hollywood Hex, Creation Books, 1999
Car Crash Culture (ed.), New York: Palgrave, 2002.
Funny Peculiar: Gershon Legman and the Psychopathology of Humor, Hillsdale, NJ: Analytic Press, Inc., 2004.
Offensive Films, Nashville: Vanderbilt University Press, 2005.
High Theory, Low Culture, New York: Palgrave, 2005.
The Solitary Vice: Against Reading, Los Angeles: Counterpoint, 2009.
Phantoms of the Clinic: From Thought-Transference to Projective Identification, Karnac Books, 2011.
Hyena, Reaktion Books - Animal, 2012.
Thirteen Girls, Nine Banded Books, 2012.
The Great Grisby: Two Thousand Years of Literary, Royal, Philosophical, and Artistic Dog Lovers and Their Exceptional Animals, HarperCollins, 2014.
The Maximum Security Book Club: Reading Literature in a Men's Prison, HarperCollins, 2016.
An Unexplained Death: A True Story of a Body at the Belvedere, Henry Holt, 2018.
Couple Found Slain: After a Family Murder. Henry Holt, 2021.

References

External links

British essayists
British non-fiction writers
Living people
British psychoanalysts
1966 births
Alumni of St Hilda's College, Oxford
Maryland Institute College of Art faculty
British expatriates in the United States